Elmdale is a city in Chase County, Kansas, United States.  As of the 2020 census, the population of the city was 40.  It is located along U.S. Route 50 highway.

History

In 1806, Zebulon Pike led the Pike Expedition westward from St Louis, Missouri, of which part of their journey followed the Cottonwood River through Chase County near the current city of Elmdale.

In 1854, the Kansas Territory was organized, then in 1861 Kansas became the 34th U.S. state.  In 1859, Chase County was established within the Kansas Territory, which included the land for modern day Elmdale.

In 1871, the Atchison, Topeka and Santa Fe Railway built a main line east-west through Elmdale.  In 1873, a post office was relocated from Middle Creek (an extinct town), to the rail community of Elmdale.  Elmdale was incorporated in 1904.

In 1916, Camp Wood YMCA was built about 1.5 miles south of Elmdale.

There have been numerous floods during the history of Elmdale.  In June and July 1951, due to heavy rains, rivers and streams flooded numerous cities in Kansas, including Elmdale.  Many reservoirs and levees were built in Kansas as part of a response to the Great Flood of 1951.  A levy was built and saved the town from numerous floods, but in 1998 a flood went over the levy.

Geography
Elmdale is located in the Flint Hills of the Great Plains. The Cottonwood River is approximately 0.5 miles east of the city.

Climate
The climate in this area is characterized by hot, humid summers and generally mild to cool winters.  According to the Köppen Climate Classification system, Elmdale has a humid subtropical climate, abbreviated "Cfa" on climate maps.

Demographics

Elmdale is part of the Emporia Micropolitan Statistical Area.

2010 census
As of the census of 2010, there were 55 people, 23 households, and 11 families residing in the city. The racial makeup of the city was 96.4% White and 3.6% from two or more races. Hispanic or Latino of any race were 9.1% of the population.

There were 23 households, of which 26.1% had children under the age of 18 living with them, 39.1% were married couples living together, 4.3% had a female householder with no husband present, 4.3% had a male householder with no wife present, and 52.2% were non-families. 43.5% of all households were made up of individuals, and 13% had someone living alone who was 65 years of age or older. The average household size was 2.39 and the average family size was 3.09.

The median age in the city was 45.3 years. 23.6% of residents were under the age of 18; 9.1% were between the ages of 18 and 24; 16.3% were from 25 to 44; 38.2% were from 45 to 64; and 12.7% were 65 years of age or older. The gender makeup of the city was 56.4% male and 43.6% female.

2000 census
As of the census of 2000, there were 50 people, 25 households, and 11 families residing in the city. The racial makeup of the city was 100.00% White. Hispanic or Latino of any race were 4.00% of the population.

There were 25 households, out of which 20.0% had children under the age of 18 living with them, 40.0% were married couples living together, and 56.0% were non-families. 48.0% of all households were made up of individuals, and 20.0% had someone living alone who was 65 years of age or older. The average household size was 2.00 and the average family size was 2.91.

In the city, the population was spread out, with 20.0% under the age of 18, 6.0% from 18 to 24, 22.0% from 25 to 44, 34.0% from 45 to 64, and 18.0% who were 65 years of age or older. The median age was 47 years. For every 100 females, there were 108.3 males. For every 100 females age 18 and over, there were 81.8 males.

As of 2000 the median income for a household in the city was $21,250, and the median income for a family was $22,250. Males had a median income of $22,917 versus $12,083 for females. The per capita income for the city was $13,083. There were no families and 19.2% of the population living below the poverty line, including no under eighteen and none of those over 64.

Arts and culture
The Clover Cliff Ranch House is listed on the National Register of Historic Places.  It is located 4 miles southwest of Elmdale along the north side of U.S. Route 50 highway.

Government
The Elmdale consists of a mayor and five council members.

Education
The community is served by Chase County USD 284 public school district.  It has two schools.
 Chase County Junior/Senior High School, 600 Main St in Cottonwood Falls.
 Chase County Elementary School, 410 Palmer St in Strong City.

Before the creation of USD 284, the Elmdale Cougars won the Kansas State High School class B baseball championship in 1961.  In 1967, the high school closed, then later the grade school.

Infrastructure

Transportation
U.S. Route 50 highway and BNSF Railway pass through the city.

See also
 National Register of Historic Places listings in Chase County, Kansas
 Cottonwood River and Great Flood of 1951

References

Further reading

External links

 Elmdale - Directory of Public Officials
 Elmdale, A "Quiet" town of Chase County, Kansas, History and photographs.
 Historic Images of Elmdale, Special Photo Collections at Wichita State University Library.
 Elmdale city map, KDOT
 Topo Map of Elmdale / Clements area, USGS

Cities in Chase County, Kansas
Cities in Kansas
Emporia, Kansas micropolitan area